Homoeosoma capsitanella is a species of snout moth in the genus Homoeosoma. It was described by Pierre Chrétien in 1911. It is found in the Palestinian territories and Israel.

The wingspan is 18–20 mm.

References

Moths described in 1911
Phycitini